Underberg is a digestif bitter produced at Rheinberg in Germany by Underberg AG. It is made from aromatic herbs from 43 countries that undergo inspections and are formulated based on a secret recipe of the Underberg family, whose members are personally responsible for the production of the drink. Underberg is one of the most widespread kräuterlikörs on the market. Underberg contains 1.3 percent herbal extract by weight, which includes aromatic, digestion-stimulating, relaxing and calming active substances, and naturally occurring vitamin B1. The drink matures in Slovenian oak barrels for several months to enhance the taste. Underberg is classified under "food and drinks: oils, herbs and spices" in the United States and can be sold without any sort of liquor license.

History
On June 17, 1846, Hubert Underberg founded the company H. Underberg-Albrecht in Rheinberg in Germany, starting the manufacture and sale of Underberg, a specialty made with aromatic herbs. In 1884, Hubert Underberg began to export his product to Brazil. In 1932, the grandson of the founder, Dr. Paul Underberg moved to Brazil and began to manufacture the "Underberg do Brasil". This product made in the country with Brazilian herbs has become, over the decades, an original Brazilian specialty and henceforth bears the name Brasilberg from the house "Underberg do Brasil".

Underberg is based on a secret and proprietary recipe, guarded by the Underberg family since the company was founded by Hubert Underberg-Albrecht in 1846. The herbs are distilled using a process called semper idem (or "always the same"). The extracts are then matured for months in barrels made of Slovenian oak.

Production ceased in 1939 due to lack of raw materials and was restarted in December 1949. The drink is usually associated with its portion-sized 20 ml bottle, designed in 1949 by Emil Underberg, grandson of the founder. The mini-bottle is protected by a straw paper sleeve, and the embossed Underberg label is glued on. All of its elements, including shape of the bottle, colour, packaging and the Underberg name are trademarked and copyrighted.

Notable fans of Underberg in the modern era include MF Doom, Amon Amarth, Chumlee and Thomas Lyons. Frozen pizza review icon Paul Theisen also promotes the bitters in his internet musings.

To promote the brand, the Underberg company rewards branded merchandise to its users after collecting a certain number of bottlecaps.

Gallery

See also
Becherovka
Kräuterlikör
Unicum

References

External links

German distilled drinks
Bitters
Herbal liqueurs
German brands
Purveyors to the Imperial and Royal Court
Companies based in North Rhine-Westphalia